Todd Mission is a city in Grimes County, Texas, United States. The population was 107 as of the 2010 census, down from 146 at the 2000 census. The city is home to the Texas Renaissance Festival.

Geography

Demographics

As of the census of 2000, there were 146 people, 56 households, and 33 families residing in the city. The population density was 69.7 people per square mile (26.8/km). There were 75 housing units at an average density of 35.8/sq mi (13.8/km). The racial makeup of the city was 80.82% White, 3.42% African American, 15.75% from other races. Hispanic or Latino of any race was 18.49% of the population.

There were 56 households, out of which 30.4% had children under the age of 18 living in them, 44.6% had married couples living together, 5.4% had a female householder with no husband present, and 39.3% had non-families; 25.0% of all households were made up of individuals, and 5.4% had someone living alone who was 65 years of age or older. The average household size was 2.61 persons and the average family size was 3.21 persons.

In the city, the population was spread out, with 23.3% under the age of 18, 8.9% from 18 to 24, 38.4% from 25 to 44, 23.3% from 45 to 64, and 6.2% 65 years of age or older. The median age was 34 years. For every 100 females, there were 124.6 males. For every 100 females age 18 and over, there were 128.6 males.

The median income for a household in the city was $40,313, and the median income for a family was $40,750. Males had a median income of $24,583 versus $21,458 for females. The per capita income for the city was $16,309. There were 6.5% of families and 10.4% of the population living below the poverty line, including 18.2% under eighteen years and 33.3% over 64.

Education
Todd Mission is served by the Navasota Independent School District. Its comprehensive high school is Navasota High School.

Economy
Todd Mission is home to the renaissance fair with the largest annual attendance in the United States, the Texas Renaissance Festival.

References

Cities in Grimes County, Texas
Cities in Texas